Lana is a female given name and short name of multiple origins. It can be found most frequently in the English-speaking countries, former Yugoslavia, and as a short form of several Russian names such as Svetlana. Lana can also be derived from the Germanic name Alana or the Greek name Helen.

Other possible origins include the Irish Gaelic , meaning 'little rock'. The name's use in Irish probably derives from the phrase , which was used to call a child. In Hawaiian it means 'calm as still waters' or 'afloat'.

In the English-speaking world, the name was popularized by actress Lana Turner.

Notable people

Actors
Lana Barić (born 1979), Croatian actress 
Lana Clarkson (1962–2003), American actress and fashion model
Lana Condor (born 1997), American actress
Lana Golja, Australian actress
Lana Marconi (1917–1990), Romanian-French actress, born Ecaterina Ileana Marcovici
Lana Morris (1930–1998), English actress
Lana Nodin (born 1979), Malaysian actress and model
Lana Parrilla (born 1977), American actress
Lana Turner (1921–1995), American actress, born Julia Jean Turner
Lana Wachowski (born 1965), American director
Lana Wood (born 1946), American actress best known for her role as 'Plenty O'Toole' in the 1971 James Bond film Diamonds Are Forever

Politics 

 Lana Gogoberidze (born 1928), Georgian politician and film director
 Lana Gordon (born 1950), American politician from Kansas
 Lana Greenfield (born 1951), American politician from South Dakota
 Lana Hurdle, American public official
 Lana Jalosjos, Filipino politician
 Lana Ladd Stokan (born 1958), American politician
 Lana Lokteff (born 1979), American political YouTuber
 Lana Mamkegh, Jordanian politician and journalist
 Lana Marks (born 1953), American business executive, diplomat and fashion designer
 Lana Myers, American judge from Texas
 Lana Nusseibeh, Emirati politician
 Lana Popham (born 1968), Canadian politician from British Columbia
 Lana Theis (born 1965), American politician from Michigan

Singers
Lana Cantrell (born 1943), Australian-American singer and entertainment lawyer
Lana Chapel, American singer-songwriter
Lana Del Rey, real name Elizabeth Grant (born 1985), American singer
Lana Gordon, American singer
Lana Jurčević (born 1984), Croatian singer
Lana Lane, American singer
Lana Lo, American singer
Lana Mir, Ukrainian singer-songwriter
Lana Moorer (born 1970), American rapper, DJ, actress and entrepreneur
Lana Trotovšek (born 1983), Slovenian violinist
Lana Wolf (born 1975), Dutch singer
Lana Lubany (born 1996),
Palestinian-American singer based in London

Sports
Lana Bagen (born 1996), British figure skater
Lana Clelland (born 1993), Scottish footballer
Lana du Pont (born 1939), American equestrian
Lana Feras (born 1998), Jordanian footballer
Lana Franković (born 1991), Croatian handball player
Lana Gehring (born 1990), American short track speed skater
Lana Golob (born 1999), Slovenian footballer
Lana Gorgadze (born 1997), Georgian footballer
Lana Harch (born 1984), Australian soccer player
Lana Harrison (born 1992), New Zealand professional squash player
Lana Jēkabsone (born 1974), Latvian hurdler
Lana Lawless (born 1953), American professional golfer
Lana Popadić (born 1983), Croatian tennis player
Lana Pudar (born 2006), Bosnian-Herzegovinian swimmer
Lana Skeledžija (born 1982), Croatian sport shooter
Lana, real name Catherine Joy Perry (born 1985), American professional wrestler in WWE

Other fields
Lana Abdel Rahman, Lebanese writer and journalist
Lana Bastašić (born 1986), Serbian writer, novelist and translator
Lana Citron (born 1969), Irish novelist, poet, short story writer, and screenwriter
Lana Coc-Kroft (born 1967), New Zealand television and radio personality, and Miss Universe New Zealand 1988
Lana Gay, Canadian radio personality and music journalist
Lana Jones, Australian ballet dancer
Lana Lopesi, New Zealand writer and critic
Lana Montalbán, Argentine journalist, TV anchor, and producer
Lana Obad (born 1988), winner of Miss Croatia 2010

Fictional characters

In film and television
Lana Crawford in Neighbours, played by Bridget Neval
Lana Lang in DC Comics Superman and the television series Smallville, played by Kristin Kreuk
Lana Jacobs in Shortland Street, played by Brook Williams
Lana Lazar in the Gone novel series
Lana Winters in American Horror Story: Asylum, played by Sarah Paulson
Lana Kane in TV series Archer, played by Aisha Tyler
Lana Herman, Theo's dream girl in The Cosby Show
Lana Loud in the animated TV series The Loud House
Lana Isavia in the anime TV series Super Dimension Cavalry Southern Cross
Lana, a Trial Captain in both the video game and anime versions of Pokémon Sun and Moon
Lana in Hyrule Warriors and Hyrule Warriors Legends
 Lana, a prostitute in 1983 film Risky Business, played by Rebecca De Mornay

In literature
Llana of Gathol, four-part series by Edgar Rice Burroughs
Wild Energy. Lana, a 2006 Ukrainian fantasy novel

In music
"Beautiful Lana", sung by Roy Orbison
"Lana", sung by The Beach Boys

In video games
Lana Beniko in Star Wars: The Old Republic
Lana, the Water-type Trial Captain in Pokémon Sun and Moon and Pokémon Ultra Sun and Ultra Moon.
Lana Skye in Phoenix Wright: Ace Attorney

See also
Svetlana
Lana, chimpanzee used in language research
Lana (disambiguation)

References

English feminine given names
Spanish feminine given names
Arabic feminine given names
Russian feminine given names